NSU may refer to:

Universities

U.S.
 Nevada State University, University of Nevada, Reno
 New School University, New York
 Northeastern State University, Oklahoma
 Nicholls State University, Louisiana
 Northwestern State University, Louisiana
 Northern State University, South Dakota
 Norfolk State University, Virginia
 Nova Southeastern University, Florida

Japan
 Nagoya Sangyo University, a private university in Owariasahi, Aichi, Japan
 Niigata Sangyo University, a private university in Kashiwazaki, Niigata, Japan
 Niigata Seiryo University, a private university in Niigata, Niigata, Japan

Other countries
 Namangan State University, Namangan, Uzbekistan
 Nasarawa State University, Keffi, Nigeria
 Naval State University, Biliran, Philippines
 Nepal Sanskrit University, Beljhundi, Dang, midwestern Development Region, Nepal
 Netaji Subhas University, Jharkhand, India
 Nordic Summer University, Scandinavia
 North South University, first privately run University of Bangladesh
 Novosibirsk State University, Siberia, Russia

Political groups
 National Socialist Underground, German far-right terrorist group
 Non-Partisan Solidarity Union, a political party in Taiwan
 Nepal Student Union, one of the major student political wings in Nepal
 Norwegian Seafarers' Union, a trade union in Norway

Vehicles
 NSU Motorenwerke, a German manufacturer of cars and motorcycles
 NSU Sulmobil, a three-wheeled car, 1905 to 1909
 NSU Delphin III, a streamliner motorcycle that set the motorcycle land speed record in 1956
 Commonwealth Railways NSU class, an Australia class of diesel-electric locomotive
 NSU station, a Tide Light Rail station in Norfolk, Virginia, Norfolk State University
 Nakajima-Fokker Super Universal, Fokker Super Universal, an airplane produced in the U.S., 1920s

Other uses
 Garda National Surveillance Unit (NSU), Irish police intelligence agency
 NASA Space Universe, American punk rock band
 Narail Sadar Upazila, Narail District, Khulna, Bangladesh
 Noakhali Sadar Upazila, Noakhali District, Chittagong, Bangladesh
 Non-specific urethritis, non-gonococcal urethritis
 Norske Skog Union, a paper mill located in Skien in Norway
 NSU University School, pre-K through 12 school in Fort Lauderdale, Florida
 "N.S.U.", a song by Cream from the 1966 album Fresh Cream